Everybody's Tennis Portable, also known as Everybody's Tennis in the PAL region, Hot Shots Tennis: Get a Grip in North America, and  in Japan, is the sixth game in the Everybody's Golf series and the third released for PlayStation Portable.

Reception

The game received "favourable" reviews according to the review aggregation website Metacritic. Eurogamer said: "Everybody's Tennis is the ideal handheld approach to the sport, exchanging realism for lightheartedness without compromising the quality of the tennis". In Japan, Famitsu gave it a score of two nines and two eights for a total of 34 out of 40.

References

External links
 

2010 video games
PlayStation Portable games
PlayStation Portable-only games
Sony Interactive Entertainment games
Tennis video games
Everybody's Golf
Video games developed in Japan